Cheapness and Beauty is the fifth studio album by Boy George, released in 1995. It peaked at number 44 on the UK Albums Chart.

Background
Having scored his biggest solo success in the US and Canada with the theme song for the movie The Crying Game in 1992, George decided to move away from an electronic sound and record some rock-oriented tracks with a glam-rock edge. One of the reasons he cited for this move was revisiting his teenage years while writing his autobiography, Take It Like a Man, which was released around the same time as the album. The album also marked the first time in which George didn't hide his gay sexuality in the lyrics. The tracks "Genocide Peroxide" and "Il Adore" were both later featured in the musical Taboo.

Singles
The album opens with a cover version of Iggy Pop's "Funtime", which was released as a single and reached number 45 in the UK Singles Chart. Another single was the ballad "Il Adore" which peaked at number 50, and "Same Thing in Reverse", which reached number 56 in the UK and number 28 on the US Billboard Dance Charts.

Track listing
All tracks composed by George O'Dowd (Boy George) and John Themis; except where indicated
 "Funtime" – 3:05 (Iggy Pop, David Bowie)
 "Satan's Butterfly Ball" – 3:03
 "Sad" – 3:52
 "God Don't Hold a Grudge" – 2:49
 "Genocide Peroxide" – 3:44
 "If I Could Fly" – 4:04
 "Same Thing in Reverse" – 3:33
 "Cheapness and Beauty" – 3:59
 "Evil Is So Civilised" – 3:32
 "Your Love Is What I Am" – 4:12
 "Blindman" – 4:42
 "Unfinished Business" – 3:33
 "Il Adore" – 6:12

Personnel
 Boy George – lead vocals
 John Themis – guitar, vocals and musical director
 Winston Blisset – bass guitar
 Tansay Ibrahim – drums
 Mike Timothy – keyboards
 Lady Zee, Linda Duggan, Stefan Frank – other vocals
 Luís Jardim – ethnic percussion on track 11
 Hossam Ramzy – mandolin
 Martin Bell – extra drums
 Uli Webber – cover picture
 Jessica Corcoran – production
 John Themis – production on tracks 5, 6 and 13

Charts

Weekly charts

References

External links
 [ Review at AllMusic]

1995 albums
Boy George albums
Virgin Records albums